Paul Stephenson may refer to:

 Paul Stephenson (footballer) (born 1968), British footballer
 Paul Stephenson (civil rights campaigner) (born 1937), British civil rights campaigner
 Paul Stephenson (police officer) (born 1953), Metropolitan Police Commissioner, 2009–2011
 Paul Stephenson (rugby league) (born 1983), Australian rugby league footballer

See also
 Paul Stevenson (born 1955), Australian psychologist
 Paul Stevenson (badminton) (born 1966), Australian badminton player